Now That's What I Call Music! 23 was released on November 7, 2006. The album is the 23rd edition of the (U.S.) Now! series. It sold over 337,000 copies in its opening week to debut at number one on the Billboard 200, becoming the tenth chart topper in the series. It also reached number three on the Top R&B/Hip-Hop Albums chart.

Now! 23 has been certified 2× Platinum and features three Billboard Hot 100 number-one hits, "London Bridge", "Promiscuous" and "SexyBack".

Track listing

Charts

Weekly charts

Year-end charts

References

2006 compilation albums
 023
Sony Music compilation albums